Earlehurst is an unincorporated community in Alleghany County, Virginia, United States.

Climate
The climate in this area is characterized by hot, humid summers and generally mild to cool winters.  According to the Köppen Climate Classification system, Earlehurst has a humid subtropical climate, abbreviated "Cfa" on climate maps.

References

GNIS reference

Unincorporated communities in Virginia
Unincorporated communities in Alleghany County, Virginia